Vital Kibuk (born 7 January 1989) is a Belarusian professional football player who plays for Volna Pinsk.

Honours
Minsk
Belarusian Cup winner: 2012–13

Torpedo-BelAZ Zhodino
Belarusian Cup winner: 2015–16

References

External links
 
 

1989 births
Living people
Sportspeople from Pinsk
Belarusian footballers
Association football wingers
FC Volna Pinsk players
FC Dynamo Brest players
FC Dinamo Minsk players
FC Minsk players
FC Torpedo-BelAZ Zhodino players
FC Granit Mikashevichi players
FC Slutsk players